In Norse mythology, Gambanteinn (Old Norse gambanteinn 'magic wand') appears in two poems in the Poetic Edda.

Hárbarðsljóð
In Hárbarðsljóð stanza 20, Hárbarðr says:
A giant hard       was Hlébard, methinks:
His gambanteinn he gave me as gift,
And I stole his wits away.

Skírnismál
In Skírnismál (Stanzas 25 to 26) Skírnir speaks to Gerd:
Seest thou, maiden,       this keen, bright sword
That I hold here in my hand?
Before its blade the        old giant bends,—
Thy father is doomed to die.

I strike thee, maid,       with my gambanteinn,
To tame thee to work my will;
There shalt thou go       where never again
The sons of men shall see thee.

Skírnir then condemns Gerd to live lonely and hideous, unloved, either married to a three-headed giant or forever unwed. It might seem that this gambanteinn also refers to the sword with which Skirnir has previously threatened Gerd. But immediately after concluding his curse, Skírnir says (stanza 32):
I go to the wood,       and to the wet forest,
To win a gambanteinn;
.   .   .   .   .   .   .   .   .  
I won a gambanteinn.
The poem then continues with further threats by Skírnir condemning Gerd to a life of misery.

Artifacts in Norse mythology